Knox Apartments, Cauthorn House and Peachtree Road Apartments Historic District is a group of three Colonial Revival apartment buildings,  one house and an original koi pond. The complex is now known as Peachtree Commons. The complex was listed with the National Register of Historic Places on March 19, 1998, with listing number 98000248.

References

External links
Peachtree Commons

Apartment buildings in Atlanta
Colonial Revival architecture in Georgia (U.S. state)
Historic districts on the National Register of Historic Places in Georgia (U.S. state)
Houses in Atlanta
National Register of Historic Places in Atlanta
Residential buildings on the National Register of Historic Places in Georgia (U.S. state)